Star China Media is a Chinese media company currently owned by China Media Capital. The company operates television channels Xing Kong and Channel V Mainland China, and maintains Fortune Star film library.

Its businesses were previously a part of the original News Corporation's Star group of television channels in Hong Kong. China Media Capital took over a percentage of shares in them in 2010, and completed acquisition in 2014.

History

Founding
Star TV (Satellite Television Asian Region) was founded in British Hong Kong (now called Hong Kong since 1997) in 1991 as a joint venture between Hutchison Whampoa and Li Ka-Shing. It was launched as a Pan-Asian beam-to-air Hollywood English-language entertainment channel for Asian audiences.

1991 - 2009 
In 1991, Star Greater China included Prime Sports, Star Plus, BBC WSTV, MTV and Star Chinese Channel.

In 1992, Rupert Murdoch's News Corporation purchased 63.6% of STAR for $525 million, followed by the purchase of the remaining 36.4% on 1 January 1993. Star broadcasting operations were run from Rupert Murdoch's Fox Broadcasting premises. Murdoch declared that:  In June 1993, Star TV and Wharf Cable signed a deal in which Hong Kong's new cable television provider would carry Star TV's channels. However, the deal was terminated in February 1994 in the carriage dispute between the two parties.

On 30 March 1996 at 7 pm Hong Kong Time, Star TV split Star Plus and Star Chinese Channel by certain areas Star Plus would serve viewers in South Asia and the Middle East, while East and Southeast Asian viewers would receive the new Star World channel and Star Chinese Channel would still be available to the viewers in Taiwan, but the television watchers in Hong Kong and the Mainland China would get the new Phoenix Chinese Channel instead.

In October 1996, Star Sports (since renamed from Prime Sports) and ESPN Asia have agreed to combine their loss making operations in Asia. The new joint venture, later named ESPN Star Sports, would be headquartered in Singapore (where ESPN's operations in Asia were based in).

In 2009, News Corporation restructured Star so Star India and Star Greater China were separated from its Hong Kong headquarters. Among the assets Star Greater China would oversaw included Xing Kong, Channel V Mainland China and Fortune Star film library.

Sale to CMC
In August 2010, it was announced that News Corporation would sell a controlling stake in its assets in mainland China to China Media Capital (CMC), which was headed by Li Ruigang (of Shanghai Media Group). Xing Kong (both dosmetic and international versions) and Channel V Mainland China, plus Fortune Star film library were in the sale, and a joint venture named Star China Media was created in the process.

In January 2014, the company's management team and CMC acquired the remaining stake from 21st Century Fox (which took television businesses from the original News Corporation in the 2013 split). This marked 21st Century Fox's exit from Mandarin entertainment television market in Mainland China.

Businesses
Television channels
 Xing Kong
Television production
 Canxing Media
Film library
 Fortune Star

See also
 Disney Star (formerly Star India)
 Star (Disney+)
 Fox Networks Group
 Fox Networks Group Asia Pacific
 Fox Networks Group Middle East

References

External links
 Xing Kong
 Canxing Media
 Fortune Star

Mass media in China
Mass media companies of China
Television networks in China
Television production companies of China
Mass media companies established in 1991
Former News Corporation subsidiaries
1991 establishments in Hong Kong